Neri Vera is a Paraguayan handball coach of the Paraguay national team, that he coached at the 2017 World Women's Handball Championship.

References

Living people
Paraguayan sports coaches
Year of birth missing (living people)
Place of birth missing (living people)
Handball coaches of international teams
21st-century Paraguayan people
Handball in Paraguay